The Washington Accord is an international accreditation agreement for undergraduate professional engineering academic degrees between the bodies responsible for accreditation in its signatory countries. The full signatories as of 2022 are Australia, Canada, China, Costa Rica, Hong Kong, India, Indonesia, Ireland, Japan, Korea, Malaysia, Mexico, New Zealand, Pakistan, Peru, Philippines, Russia, Singapore, South Africa, Sri Lanka, Taiwan, Turkey, the United Kingdom and the United States.

Overview
The Washington Accord recognizes that there is substantial equivalence of programs accredited by those signatories. Graduates of accredited programs in any of the signatory countries are recognized by the other signatory countries as having met the academic requirements for entry to the practice of engineering. Recognition of accredited programs is not retroactive but takes effect only from the date of admission of the country to signatory status.

Scope
The Washington Accord covers both undergraduate and postgraduate engineering degrees. Engineering technology programs are not covered by the accord. Engineering technology programs are covered under the Sydney Accord and Dublin Accord. Only qualifications awarded after the signatory country or region became part of the Washington Accord are recognized. The accord is not directly responsible for the licensing of professional engineers and the registration of chartered engineers but it does cover the academic requirements that are part of the licensing processes in signatory countries.

Signatories
The following are the signatory countries and territories of the Washington Accord, their respective accreditation bodies and years of admission:

The following countries have provisional signatory status and may become member signatories in the future:

See also
 Regulation and licensure in engineering
 Seoul Accord
 European Engineer

References

External links
International Engineering Alliance (IEA) official website
International Engineering Alliance Washington Accord
International Engineering Alliance Washington accord signatories

Professional titles and certifications
Engineering education
Accreditation organizations